David East may refer to:
David East (police officer), former Chief Constable of South Wales and secretary of the Welsh Rugby Union
David East (artist), American ceramic artist
David East (cricketer) (born 1959), English cricketer
David Warren East (born 1961), British businessman